Induced myeloid leukemia cell differentiation protein Mcl-1 is a protein that in humans is encoded by the MCL1 gene.

Function 

The protein encoded by this gene belongs to the Bcl-2 family. Alternative splicing occurs at this locus and two transcript variants encoding distinct isoforms have been identified. The longer gene product (isoform 1) enhances cell survival by inhibiting apoptosis while the alternatively spliced shorter gene product (isoform 2) promotes apoptosis and is death-inducing. The protein MCL1 has a very short biological half-life of only 20–30 minutes.

The loss of MCL1 has a more dramatic impact than the loss of any other anti-apoptotic member of the Bcl-2 family. Loss of the Mcl-1 gene results in embryo death when the embryo is only around 3.5 days old, before it has even implanted. Conditional deletion of Mcl-1 depletes a wide variety of cells, including hematopoietic stem cells, B cell–committed progenitors, T cell–committed progenitors, antibody-secreting plasma cells, cardiac muscle cells, and neurons. Deletion of Mcl-1 in hepatocytes causes apoptosis and aberrant polyploidization but improves liver regeneration after surgery. MCL1 works synergistically with p53 in protecting liver from injury, fibrosis and cancer.

MCL1 also has a role in the cell's energy production, working in the intermitochondrial space.

Clinical significance
Omacetaxine mepesuccinate (a drug approved for the treatment for chronic myelogenous leukemia) and Seliciclib (which is under investigation as a potential multiple myeloma treatment) both act in part by inhibiting synthesis of Mcl-1. MCL1 has been identified as a resistance factor for BCL-2 inhibitor venetoclax in lymphoma cells. Therefore, new strategies of combining BCL-2 and MCL1 inhibitors are currently under clinical trials for several tumor types.

Interactions 

MCL1 has been shown to interact with:
 BAK1, 
 BCL2L11, 
 BID,
 BAD, 
 DAD1, 
 PMAIP1, 
 PCNA,
 TCTP  and
 TNKS

See also 
Bcl-2
Bcl-xL

References

Further reading

External links